Merkel High School is a public high school located in Merkel, Texas, United States, and classified as a 3A school by the UIL. It is part of the Merkel Independent School District. The high school serves approximately 330 students from areas on the Northwestern part of Taylor County. Generally students from the area come from either Merkel, Tye, or Trent. A small portion of southwestern Jones County lies within the district also. The district and the school are both named after the Baylor Merkel, the first settler in the area. In 2016, the school was rated "Met Standard" by the Texas Education Agency.

Athletics
The Merkel Badgers compete in these sports - 

Cross Country, Football, Basketball, Powerlifting, Golf, Track, Softball, Volleyball & Baseball

State titles
Men’s Pole Vault 
• 1978(2A)-Brad Pursley

Girls 100m hurdles
2007(2A)  - Carly Szabo, 2008(2A) - Carly Szabo, 2010(2A) - Carly Szabo

Girls 300m hurdles
2007(2A) - Carly Szabo, 2008(2A) - Carly  Szabo 
Girls High Jump - 
2015(3A) - Abigail Lally, 2016(3A) - Abigail Lally

(2023) Women’s Powerlifting
Avery Chacon

State finalists
Girls Basketball - 
 2013(2A)
100m hurdles silver medalist 2009(2A)- Carly Szabo
300m hurdles silver medalist 2009(2A)- Carly Szabo
High Jump Bronze Medalist 2008(2A)- Carly Szabo, Bronze medalist 2009(2A)- Carly Szabo, Silver medalist 2010(2A)- Carly Szabo

Academics

The Merkel High School Academics teams compete in these events - 

Computer Sciences, Computer Applications, Extemporaneous Speaking, Dramatic Interpretation, Mathematics, Social Studies, Literary Criticism, Debate

Notable alumni
Cody Lambert, rodeo star

References

External links
 Merkel ISD

High schools in Texas
Schools in Jones County, Texas
High schools in Taylor County, Texas
Public high schools in Texas